The Finland cricket team toured Denmark to play a two-match Twenty20 International (T20I) series in July 2019. These were the first ever matches played by Finland to have T20I status after the International Cricket Council announced that all matches played between Associate Members after 1 January 2019 would have full T20I status. The venue for both matches was Svanholm Park in Brøndby, these being the first T20I matches to be played in Denmark. Denmark won the series 2–0.

Squads

Tour matches

1st T20 match

2nd T20 match

T20I series

1st T20I

2nd T20I

References

External links
 Series home at ESPN Cricinfo

Cricket in Denmark
Cricket in Finland
Associate international cricket competitions in 2019